McIntosh, Ontario may refer to:

McIntosh, Bruce County, Ontario
McIntosh, Kenora District, Ontario